The 1925 DePaul Blue Demons football team was an American football team that represented DePaul University as a member of the Western Interstate Conference (WIC) during the 1925 college football season. The team compiled a 4–2–1 record and outscored opponents by a total of 89 to 42. 

In July 1925, DePaul hired Eddie Anderson as its head football, basketball, and track coach. He had played at the end position for Knute Rockne at Notre Dame and served as head football coach at Columbia (IA) from 1922 to 1924. Rockne called him "one of the smartest players I have ever coached."

Schedule

References

DePaul
DePaul Blue Demons football seasons
DePaul Blue Demons football